European route E47 is a road (part of the United Nations international E-road network) connecting Lübeck in Germany to Helsingborg in Sweden via the Danish capital, Copenhagen. It is also known as the Vogelfluglinie (German) or Fugleflugtslinjen (Danish). A fixed link between Germany and Denmark was planned to have been completed by 2020, now delayed to 2028. It will be a tunnel rather than a bridge. Although a bridge-tunnel combination (the Øresund Bridge) has been constructed between Denmark and Sweden further south, a very frequent ferry service continues to operate between Helsingør in Denmark and the northern terminus of the E47 at Helsingborg in Sweden.

Other road numbers 
The ferry route Helsingborg–Helsingør is part of E47 according to the UN definition, and signposted so in Denmark, but the ferry is not signposted with any road number in Sweden. The ferry was part of E4 until 1992, but was signposted so for several further years in Sweden.

The Danish E-roads have no other national numbers (the national number is the same as the E-number, here 47, but only the E-sign is posted). Between Helsingborg and Eskilstrup on the island of Falster, 160 km, the E47 shares road with the E55. Since 2018 E55 is not signposted between Helsingør and Køge. Between Køge and Copenhagen (29 km), also the E20 shares the same road. Danish roads 9 and 19 share roads with the E47 short parts.

In Germany the motorway has the national number BAB 1. The part without motorway has the national number B 207. This part is a kind of expressway without any roads crossing on the same level. It has a number of road crossings built like motorway exits.

At the introduction of the new numbering scheme in 1992, the E47 was originally devised to continue from Helsingborg northward through Sweden and Norway to Gothenburg, Oslo, Trondheim and finally Olderfjord, replacing almost all of the old European route E6. After negotiations between UNECE and the Swedish and Norwegian authorities, this plan was abandoned, and the E6 remains designated as such, both on signage and in the official documents, throughout its entire old length in Scandinavia (including the snippets Trelleborg–Malmö and Malmö–Helsingborg, which are concurrent with the E22 and the E20 respectively, and were never intended to become parts of the E47). A similar solution was made for the E4 through Sweden. These two roads are the most conspicuous exceptions to the rule that even numbers signify west-to-east E-roads.

Exits and service areas in Denmark 

 3 Espergærde
 4 Kvistgård
 5 Humlebæk
 6 Nivå
 7 Kokkedal
 9 Hørsholm C
| Isterød
 10 Hørsholm S
 12 Vedbæk
 13 Gl. Holte
 14 Nærum
| Lærkereden/Storkereden
 15 Lundtofte
 16 Lyngby C
 Kgs. Lyngby  København
 17 Jægersborgvej
 18 Nyborgvej
 19 Buddinge
 Gladsaxe  Hillerød  Copenhagen
 20 Gladsaxe
 21 Frederikssundvej
 23 Jyllingevej
 Rødovre  Frederikssund,  Ballerup
 24 Roskildevej
 Brøndby  Roskilde  Copenhagen
 Avedøre Malmö
 25 Vallensbæk S
 26 Ishøj Strand
 Ishøj  Ballerup,  Ishøj 
 27 Greve N
 28 Greve C
 29 Greve S
 |  Karlslunde
 30 Solrød N
 31 Solrød S  Roskilde
 32 Køge
 Køge Vest  Odense
 33 Lellinge
 34 Herfølge
 35 Haslev
| Piberhus
 36 Bregentved
 Rønnede  Næstved (planned)
 37 Rønnede  
 38 Tappernøje |
 39 Bårse
 40 Udby
 41 Vordingborg
Northern Farø bridge
 42 Farø 
Southern Farø bridge
 43 Nørre Alslev
 44 Eskildstrup  Nykøbing F, Gedser
 45 Guldborg, Majbølle
 46 Sakskøbing
 47 Våbensted
 48 Maribo  Tårs (ferry port)
 49 Holeby
 50 Rødbyhavn

Exits and service areas in Germany
Common with road 207
1 Puttgarden ferry port
2 Burg auf Fehmarn
3 Avendorf
Fehmarn Sound bridge
Petrol station
4 Großenbrode
Common with Bundesautobahn 1
See the Bundesautobahn 1 article for the exit list.

Termini 
The northern terminus is at the ferry port in Helsingborg, where the European route E4 begins. The southern terminus is at E22 north of Lübeck.

References

External links 
 UN Economic Commission for Europe: Overall Map of E-road Network (2007)

47
E047
E047
E047
E047
E047